Chillum may refer to:
 Chillum (pipe)
 Chillum, Maryland
 Chillum, an album by the band Second Hand
 West Hyattsville (WMATA station), originally planned to be named Chillum